Scarus dimidiatus, also known as the yellowbarred parrotfish, is a  marine ray-finned fish, a parrotfish from the family Scaridae. It is found in the western Pacific Ocean from Indonesia east to Samoa as far north as the Ryukyu Islands and as far south as the Great Barrier Reef.

Ecology
This species lives in coral-filled waters in protected reefs. This species lives in depths of 1 to 12m.

References

External links
 

dimidiatus
Taxa named by Pieter Bleeker
Fish described in 1859